The Mityana District is a district in the Central Region of Uganda. The district was created in 2005, by taking the Mityana and Busujju counties from Mubende District. Mityana is the site of the district headquarters.

Location
The Mityana District is bordered by Kiboga District to the north, Nakaseke District to the northeast, Wakiso District to the east, Mubende District to the west, Mpigi District to the southeast, and Butambala and Gomba Districts to the south. The coordinates of the district are 00 27N, 32 03E.

Population
The 1991 national population census estimated the district's population at 223,530. In 2002, the national census estimated the district population at 266,110. In 2012, the district population was estimated at 311,600.

Economic activity
Agriculture is the main income-earning activity in the district. Like Mubende District, the crops grown include sweet potatoes, beans, cassava, maize, bananas, groundnuts, onions, cabbage, and tomatoes. Cash crops grown in the district include coffee and tea. There are several large-scale tea estates in the district, including Namutamba Tea Estate, located at Namutamba, and Mwera Tea Estate, located at Mwera and a member of the Madhvani Group.

See also
Districts of Uganda

References

External links
 Volunteer & Tour in Mityana, Uganda with Africa's Leading Volunteer & Travel Organization
 Mityana: The Place Where Walumbe Hid

 
Districts of Uganda
Central Region, Uganda